ESJ may refer to:
 Eastern SkyJets, an Emirati airline
 École supérieure de journalisme, a French institution of higher education
 Elementary School Journal
 Episcopal School of Jacksonville, in Florida, United States
 Externado San José, a school in San Salvador, El Salvador